J-P Conte, also known as Jean-Pierre 'JP' Conte, is an American businessman and philanthropist involved in educational equity, immigration reform and conservation. Conte serves as Chairman and Managing Director of the private equity firm Genstar Capital LLC, having overseen the company's growth to $33bn in assets under management. He is also known as the founder of the Conte Initiative on Immigration Reform at the Hoover Institute, Stanford University, formerly chaired by the author and Republican economist Tim Kane.

Early life

Jean-Pierre Conte was born in Brooklyn and raised in the New York area to French and Cuban immigrant parents. His father, Pierre A. Conte, who grew up during the Nazi occupation of France, worked as a tailor and clothing salesman on Wall Street. His father had witnessed atrocities perpetrated against the French at the hands of the German SS, whose headquarters were located opposite his school, and later moved to the US at the age of 18. His mother, Isabel Conte, left Cuba after experiencing both the communist and dictatorial Batista regimes, later settling in Brooklyn.

Conte worked in low income jobs to support himself through school and college, including working as a newspaper boy, a bus boy, a waiter and security guard. After graduating from high school, Conte went on to gain a bachelor's degree from Colgate University and an MBA from Harvard Business School. He was voted 22nd of Harvard Business School's top 100 most successful finance and investing graduates in 2021 by Alumni Spotlight.

Career

Conte started his career at Chase Manhattan Bank, NYC, in 1985, before entering the private equity sector after graduating from Harvard Business School in 1989.

In 1995, Conte joined Genstar Capital, LLC and currently serves in the capacity of Chairman and Managing Director. In these roles he is in charge of acquisitions, divestitures and the supervision of portfolio companies. During his tenure, Genstar has grown from having $100 million of assets under management to $33 billion.
Conte is currently also a Director of ConnectiveRx and Signant Health and Advarra.

Philanthropy

Conte's financial support for philanthropic causes has a focus on educational equity, neuroscience, sustainability and conservation and civic freedom. Conte has founded the J-P Conte Family Foundation in 2017 with the 'aims of improving educational equity for young people, protecting the environment, and upholding freedom'.

After his father, Pierre Conte, passed away from Parkinson's disease in 2017, Conte refocused his philanthropic financial portfolio to fund and promote research into neuro-degenerative disorders. In 2018, the J-P Conte Family Foundation made a funding pledge to the neuroscience department of UCSF (University of California, San Francisco). Conte also sits on the board of the California Pacific Medical Center.

Conte serves on the board of Pepperwood Preserve, having provided funding to the organization to support their work on preserving and conserving the environment in Sonoma. Conte also serves on the board of the Pan American Development Fund, with the aim of providing education and opportunity for disadvantaged communities in Latin America and the Caribbean.

In 2015 Conte was one of the lead donors on the Bay Lights; an $8m project to illuminate the San Francisco Bay Bridge via the permanent installation of lights on the bridge's wires. In 2017 Conte was part of a group of private equity investors that raised $25 million to help Puerto Rico recover from the hurricane that devastated the island in September of that year.

Political views and advocacy

While Conte does not hold membership or singular support for any US political party, he supports protecting what he perceives as ‘American values and exceptionalism’.

Conte served on the Hoover Institution Board of Overseers and established the Conte Task Force on Immigration Reform. Co-chaired by Edward Lazear and Tim Kane, the Task Force "aimed to improve immigration policies by providing innovative ideas and economic data proving that immigration has been and will continue to be a piston of economic growth for the USA."

Conte also provides funding to the wider Hoover Institution in general, stating that he ‘believes that further education is the strongest ladder to success in any capitalist society’.

Personal life

Conte lives in California with his four children, William, Peter, Louisa and Sophie, and travels frequently, stating in 2018 interview that "I believe that as a parent, part of the mission is to teach your children about the world and different cultures." He enjoys biking, sailing, skiing and hiking with his family and friends in his free time.

References 

American businesspeople
American philanthropists
Year of birth missing (living people)
Living people
Colgate University alumni
Harvard Business School alumni